Super Scribblenauts is an emergent action puzzle game developed by 5th Cell and published by Warner Bros. Interactive Entertainment for the Nintendo DS handheld game console. The game was released on October 12, 2010. It is the sequel to the Nintendo DS game Scribblenauts.

The object of the game is to solve puzzles by writing or typing any object which exists in the game's vocabulary, in order to interact with other parts of the level. The vocabulary includes numerous adjectives that can give the object special properties that may be needed to solve a puzzle.

Gameplay

Super Scribblenauts is a side-scrolling action-oriented puzzle game that requires players to collect objects called "Starites" by inputting words, such as "ladder" or "fire", in order to collect these objects. One of Super Scribblenauts features is the ability to add characteristics to objects, such as a "green refrigerator" or "anthropomorphic antimatter". More than one adjective can be tied to a single object, making it possible to summon objects such as "big flying purple pregnant octopus". Players control the main character, Maxwell, using either the touch screen, D-Pad, or face buttons. Maxwell is a boy who has a "magical" notebook that makes written words come to life. Creating new objects with that notebook is the key to the game.

The game includes a hint system as well as an improved level editor. The level editor allows the player to create various types of levels such as playgrounds (objectiveless levels that allows players to goof off, test combinations, or create words for Ollars) or adventure missions, and allows the player to pre-spawn objects via notebook icon.

Plot
Maxwell, the game's protagonist, is tasked with using his magical NotePad to collect Starites. At the end of the game, Maxwell comes face to face with his evil Doppelganger who steals the last Starite from him. Maxwell chases him to the moon, where Doppelganger crashes his UFO, seemingly defeated. The game breaks the fourth wall by telling the player that since the final Starite was destroyed in the crash, to simply spawn a new one using the NotePad to beat the game's final level.

Reception

Super Scribblenauts has received generally favorable reviews. It currently holds a score of 81/100 on Metacritic. It holds an 8/10 on Eurogamer and a 9.0/10 on IGN. IGN Daemon Hatfield stated that "Super Scribblenauts is as fun and imaginative as you are". He also praised the game's refined control scheme and incorporation of adjectives, but criticized its low level of difficulty. The British magazine ONM gave it an 86%, saying that "it's a step above the original, nearly everything's improved here and the addition to adjectives is heartwarming. A good step in the right direction for Scribblenauts".

GameSpot, however, was not nearly as ecstatic about the game, giving it a 6.5/10 and criticizing its restrictions on user creativity and lack of "real-world logic".

Development
5th Cell revealed they improved the physics and fixed the controls, as many have complained about the predecessor's imprecise touchscreen movement system.

References

2010 video games
5th Cell games
Action-adventure games
Nintendo DS games
Nintendo DS-only games
Puzzle video games
Scribblenauts
Video games developed in the United States
Video game sequels
Warner Bros. video games